The 2014 Japanese Super Cup has been held on 22 February 2014 between the 2013 J. League champions Sanfrecce Hiroshima  and the 2013 Emperor's Cup winners Yokohama F. Marinos. Sanfrecce Hiroshima won the match 2–0 after a Gakuto Notsuda and Takuma Asano goal.

Match

References

Japanese Super Cup
Super
Japanese Super Cup
Sanfrecce Hiroshima matches
Yokohama F. Marinos
Sports competitions in Tokyo